Woodside is a historic home located at Abingdon, Harford County, Maryland.  It has a -story main section, designed in 1823, that is an excellent example of a Federal side hall, double parlor plan house. The house is constructed of coursed fieldstone and ashlar.  The property includes a stone house with overhanging gable roof, a hand pump, a shed-roofed frame storage building, an 1848 log barn, a 1928 frame corn crib, and three early 20th century garages.

It was listed on the National Register of Historic Places in 1979.

References

External links
, including photo from 1977, Maryland Historical Trust

Houses in Harford County, Maryland
Houses on the National Register of Historic Places in Maryland
Houses completed in 1823
Federal architecture in Maryland
National Register of Historic Places in Harford County, Maryland